Viviane Tabar is an American neurosurgeon, the Chair of the Department of Neurosurgery at Memorial Sloan Kettering Cancer Center in New York since 2017.

Biography 
Tabar took her medical degree from the American University of Beirut. It was followed by a neurosurgical residency at the University of Massachusetts. She did postdoctoral work at the National Institute of Neurological Disorders and Stroke.

Having done a research fellowship at Memorial Sloan Kettering Cancer Center, Tabar joined the faculty. At present, she is the Theresa C. Feng Chair for Neurosurgical Oncology and the Vice Chair for Neurosurgical Research and Education. In December 2017, she was named Chair of the Department of Neurosurgery at Memorial Sloan Kettering Cancer Center, succeeding to Philip Gutin, MD.

Viviane Tabar is also the founding Director of the Multidisciplinary Pituitary and Skull Base Tumor Center at Memorial Sloan Kettering Cancer Center.

Work 
Tabar’s specialty is intraoperative brain mapping techniques.

Her research is in stem cell biology, and she is one of the leaders of the New York State consortium for the development of human embryonic stem cell–derived dopamine neurons for Parkinson’s disease. She has devised strategies for cell-based therapies for the repair of radiation-induced brain injury. Her lab has used pluripotent stem cells for brain tumor modeling, resulting in novel insights into the biology of gliomas and to the discovery of candidate therapeutic targets for brain tumors. She has a clinical expertise in the surgical management of brain tumors such as complex gliomas, meningiomas and skull base tumors. In 2010, with her research team of the Sloan-Kettering Cancer Center, she demonstrated the fact that tumorous blood vessel cells may come from tumor cells as a way to create their own blood supply. Those results contributed to demonstrate the great plasticity of tumors.

A prolific author, she has written dozens of widely cited publications.

Other roles 

 Since 2017: Member of the National Academy of Medicine
 Since 2014: Member of the American Society for Clinical Investigation
 Member of the Society of Neurological Surgeons
 Member of the American Association of Neurological Surgery
 Member of the American Brain Tumor Association
Friend of the Murray F. Brennan, MD, FACS, International Guest Scholarship Fund

Awards 

 2014: Top Doctors: New York Magazine
 2013: Top Doctors: New York Metro Area
 2012: Top Doctors: New York Metro Area
 2011: Top Doctors: New York Metro Area

Publications

Personal life 
Viviane Tabar is married to Lorenz Studer. They have two children together. They both work at the Sloan Kettering Institute heading medical research projects.

References

External links 
 Mentorship at Gerstner Sloan Kettering: Meet Ryan and Viviane

Living people
Memorial Sloan Kettering Cancer Center faculty
Year of birth missing (living people)
American neurosurgeons
American women physicians
American University of Beirut alumni
Place of birth missing (living people)
American neuroscientists
American women neuroscientists
Stem cell researchers
Members of the National Academy of Medicine
American women academics
21st-century American women